William Noel may refer to:
 William Noel (MP for Rutland) (1789–1859), British politician
 William Noel (1695–1762), English barrister, judge and politician, MP for Stamford, and for West Looe